The Women's Army Auxiliary Corps (WAAC), known as Queen Mary's Army Auxiliary Corps (QMAAC) from 9 April 1918, was the women's corps of the British Army during and immediately after the First World War. It was established in February 1917 and disbanded on 27 September 1921.

History

The corps was formed following a January 1917 War Office recommendation that women should be employed in non-combatant roles in the British Army in France. While recruiting began in March 1917, the corps was only formally instituted on 7 July 1917 by Lieutenant-General Sir Nevil Macready, the adjutant-general, who appointed Dr Mona Chalmers Watson the first chief controller. More than 57,000 women served between January 1917 and November 1918.

The corps was established to free up men from administrative tasks for service at the front. It was divided into four sections including cookery, mechanical and clerical. Nursing services were administered separately, although an auxiliary corps of the Royal Army Medical Corps was set up to provide medical services for the QMAAC.

On 31 March 1917, women in the WAAC were first sent to the theatre of war in France, at that stage just fourteen cooks and waitresses. Helen Gwynne-Vaughan was the chief controller overseas, and Florence Leach was the controller of the cooks. In 1918, women doctors (attached to the QMAAC) were first posted to France. One such was Dr Phoebe Chapple, who was awarded the Military Medal for tending the wounded regardless of her own safety during an air raid on an WAAC camp near Abbeville in May 1918. In all, five military medals were awarded to members of the QMAAC, all for brave conduct during air raids or shelling in rear areas.

A total of 17,000 members of the corps served overseas, although never more than 9,000 at one time. In April 1918, nearly 10,000 members employed on Royal Flying Corps air stations, both at home and in France, transferred to the Women's Royal Air Force on the formation of the Royal Air Force.

Demobilisation commenced after the Armistice in November 1918, and the corps was disbanded on 27 September 1921. The last surviving QMAAC veteran was Ivy Campany, who died in 2008.

Ranks and rank insignia
Instead of standard military ranks, a specific grading system was authorised by Army Council Instruction No. 1069, 1917. All insignia was worn on epaulettes except that for forewoman and assistant forewoman, which was worn on the right upper arm.

List of controllers
Chief controllers
 Dr Mona Chalmers Watson (February 1917 to 1918)
Hilda Horniblow (Chief Controller in France in 1917, and in England from July 1918 succeeding Mrs Long.
 Dame Florence Leach (1918 to 1920) (from 1917 Controller-in-Chief)

Controllers
 Helen Gwynne-Vaughan; Controller, later Commandant of the Women's Royal Air Force

Records
Most of the service records were destroyed in a German air raid in September 1940. Those which did have suffered fire and water and mould damage. The National Archives digitised these to prevent further damage and they can be searched and viewed online.

See also
 Women in the First World War
 First Aid Nursing Yeomanry
 Auxiliary Territorial Service
 Mechanised Transport Corps

References

External links

 Women's (later Queen Mary's) Army Auxiliary Corps (1917–1920) – DocumentsOnline research guide
 DocumentsOnline searchable service record collection
 On Waactive Service by Majorie Hay, an account of the Corp. in France 1917 – 1918, The Plymouth Press, circa 1919

British women in World War I
British administrative corps
Military units and formations established in 1917
Military units and formations disestablished in 1921